Realmente Bella Señorita Panamá 2008 was the new beauty contest format created when the Señorita Panamá contest was renewed.  It was the 42nd celebration of the Miss Panama contest and the 25th Annual contest Señorita Panamá, was held at the Estudio "B" Canal 13 Telemetro, Panama, Panama on Monday, May 26, 2008. The pageant was made to send the winner to Miss Universe 2008.

For this year, the pageant was made into a reality show and it was made to be like America's Next Top Model and each week a candidate would leave until only 4 remained.

Señorita Panamá 2005 María Alessandra Mezquita Lapadula of Panama Centro crowned Carolina Dementiev of Panama Centro as her successor at the end of the event as the new Señorita Panamá.
 
The First Runner up to Miss Continente Americano 2008. Corporacion MEDCOM S.A., organizers of Senorita Panama, did not have the rights to send a contestant to Miss World in 2008.  That year the license was property of agency Panama Talents.

Results

Special awards

Candidates

Other notes
Karina Pinilla participated in Miss Supranational 2010 and won the crown in Płock, Poland.
Geraldine Higuera was elected Miss Earth Panama 2009 and represented Panama in Miss Earth 2009.
Kathia Saldaña 4th finalist of Realmente Bella 2008, was elected Miss World Panama 2008, but did not compete in Miss World 2008 due to visa problems.
Ginelle Saldaña participated in the Reinado Internacional del Café 2008, being the 3rd finalist.

References

External links
Official Website

Señorita Panamá
2008 beauty pageants
2008 in Panama